Carel Isaak de Moor (1695, Leiden – 1751, Rotterdam) was an 18th-century painter from the Northern Netherlands.

Carel Isaak de Moor was a pupil of his father, Carel de Moor. He also made etchings. He became a teacher himself and taught the anatomy writers Petrus Camper and Johannes le Francq van Berkhey.

References

External links

1695 births
1751 deaths
18th-century Dutch painters
18th-century Dutch male artists
Dutch male painters
Artists from Leiden